Stuart Dutamby (born 24 April 1994) is a French sprinter. He competed in the men's 4 × 100 metres relay at the 2016 Summer Olympics.

References

1994 births
Living people
French male sprinters
Olympic athletes of France
Athletes (track and field) at the 2016 Summer Olympics
Sportspeople from Saint-Germain-en-Laye
World Athletics Championships athletes for France